The Stormy Night is a 1925 Chinese drama film directed and written by novelist Zhu Shouju. Like most Chinese films from this period, it is a black-and-white silent film with both Chinese and English intertitles.

The film was long believed lost, until a print resurfaced in Tokyo, Japan in 2006, which was finally identified in 2011.

Rediscovery
In 2006, descendants of Japanese director Teinosuke Kinugasa donated his collection to the National Museum of Modern Art, Tokyo. In it museum workers discovered a Chinese film (since it had Chinese intertitles), but as the title is missing they were unable to identify it right away. Many years later, Akinari Sato (佐藤秋成) convincingly confirmed it as The Stormy Night by matching it with reports from old Shanghai newspapers Shen Bao and Xinwen Bao (新聞報). Because reports mentioned the film as having 9 reels, and 8 reels are found, Sato believed that no more than 10 minutes could be missing.

The film underwent a digital restoration in 2017 and began screening in China the same year.

Cast
Han Yunzhen as Mrs. Zhuang
Zhou Wenzhu
Wang Shiyan
Wang Yingzhi
Yang Jingwo as Yujie
Bao Mengjiao as Bian Ziming
Wang Cilong as Doctor
Li Minghui as Cover girl
Gong Jianong as Club patron
Yan Bingheng as Qian Dawei
Ye Zhongfang as Sleepwalker
Wang Guoqi as Jiaona

Reception
In 2017, Japanese scholar Fumitoshi Karima (刈間文俊) called this film one of the three Chinese films that amazed him, along with silent-era masterpieces The Goddess and Love and Duty. In 2018, Shelly Kraicer called it an "astonishing revelation" on Twitter.

References

1925 films
Films shot in China
Films set in China
Chinese silent films
Chinese drama films
1925 drama films
1920s rediscovered films
Rediscovered Chinese films
Chinese black-and-white films
Silent drama films